Kaduna is the capital city of Kaduna State, and the former political capital of Northern Nigeria. It is located in north-western Nigeria, on the Kaduna River. It is a trade Centre and a major transportation hub as the gateway to northern  states of Nigeria, with its rail and important road network.

The population of Kaduna was at 760,084 as of the 2006 Nigerian census. Rapid urbanization since 2005 has created an increasingly large population, as at 2023, the estimated population is 1.1 million. The project population of people in Kaduna state as at 2021 is 8.9 million people.

Etymology
The etymology of the word Kaduna is said to be a corruption of the Hausa word for "crocodiles", Kaddani in the Hausa language (kaduna being the plural form). Another version of the name proposes a link to the Gbagyi word/name 'Odna', meaning 'river'.

History
Kaduna was founded by British colonists in 1900. The first British governor of Northern Nigeria, Sir Frederick Lugard, chose the present site for development due to its proximity to the Lagos-Kano Railway. It became the capital of Nigeria's former Northern Region in 1917, and retained this status until 1967. The city is still influential as the headquarters of various political, military and cultural organizations especially in northern Nigeria.

Economy

Industries 
Kaduna is a major industrial centre in Northern Nigeria, manufacturing products like textiles, machinery, steel, aluminium, petroleum products and bearings. However, the textile industry has been in decline due to recent Chinese imports and factory closures caused by years of neglect during the military dictatorship in Nigeria. Other light manufactures include: plastics, pharmaceuticals, leather goods, furniture, and televisions. Agriculture is also a major industry in Kaduna, and as such, the Bank of Agriculture has its headquarters in the city. Some main agricultural exports include: cotton, peanuts, sorghum, and ginger. Kaduna also has a branch of the Nigerian Stock Exchange. Automobile manufacturing also remains an important part of Kaduna's economy. Peugeot Automobiles Nigeria has an assembly plant in Kaduna.  Kaduna Refining and Petrochemical Company (KRPC), one of Nigeria's four main oil refineries is located in Kaduna. It is supplied by a pipeline from the Niger Delta oil fields.

A 2009 World Bank survey states that Kaduna is one of the top six cities with the highest unemployment. 20% of the population was estimated to be unemployed.

Sports and tourism 
There is a large racecourse named Murtala Mohammed Square, approximately  round, inside which is found the Kaduna Polo Club. Kaduna Golf Club is also located within the Kaduna CBD. Other sports facilities include the Ahmadu Bello Stadium and Ranchers Bees Stadium. There are several hotels in the city.

Infrastructure 
The infrastructure network in the city are currently being developed under the administration of Nasir el-Rufai. Kaduna has an inland dry port. The Nigerian military has several installations in the city including the Nigerian Defence Academy.

Airport 
The city is served by Kaduna International Airport. The airport commenced operations in 1982. The Nigerian Air Force maintains a presence in the city.

Railways 

Kaduna is also on the route of the planned Lagos–Kano Standard Gauge Railway, which has been completed between the national capital of Abuja and Kaduna. Trains for Abuja depart from the Rigasa Railway Station in Kaduna. Kaduna is an important junction on Nigeria's Cape gauge railway network.  At Kaduna, a branch line connects the Lagos–Nguru Railway to the Port Harcourt–Maiduguri railway.

Education 
Kaduna is popularly known as the centre of learning, as evident from the numerous educational institutions located in the state. Tertiary Institutions in Kaduna city include:

Kaduna State University
Nigerian Defence Academy (NDA), Kaduna
Greenfield University Kaduna
National Open University of Nigeria, Kaduna Study Center
 Air Force Institute of Technology, Kaduna
National Teachers Institute (NTI), Kaduna
 School of Midwifery Kaduna
Kaduna Polytechnic (1968), Kaduna
National board for Islamic and Arabic studies
Kaduna Business School
Dialogue Institute Kaduna
Institute of Ophthalmology, National Eye Centre, Kaduna.
National board for Arabic and Islamic studies
National center for nomadic education
Ahmadu Bello University, Zaria, Kaduna State

Places of worship    
Among the places of worship, there are churches and mosques. Sultan Bello Mosque is the biggest and a central mosque in Kaduna. There are also churches: Church of Nigeria (Anglican Communion), Presbyterian Church of Nigeria (World Communion of Reformed Churches), Nigerian Baptist Convention (Baptist World Alliance), Living Faith Church Worldwide, Redeemed Christian Church of God, Assemblies of God, Roman Catholic Archdiocese of Kaduna (Catholic Church), Mountain of fire and miracles ministries, North central 2 Mega Regional HQ (http://www.mountainoffire.org), Universal Reformed Christian Church, Kaduna (Protestant Church).

Climate

Notable people

Umar Farouk Abdulmutallab, the "underwear bomber" suspect of the terrorist arson attempt on Northwest flight 253 in December 2009, grew up here and returned to the city on holiday.
 Tijani Babangida, footballer who played winger with Ajax
Celestine Babayaro, footballer who played mainly in the Premier League
Michael Eneramo, footballer
Fiona Fullerton, British actress and former Bond girl
Leke James, footballer
Shehu Musa Yaradua politician and elder statesman 
Zamani Lekwot, statesman
Umaru mutallab Nigerian business mogul
Hassan usman katsina elder statesman.
Magaji Muhammed politician and elder statesman. 
Mamman daura elder statesman 
Ahmed Mohammed Makarfi, politician
Mohammed Namadi Sambo, politician
Shehu Sani, politician
Uba Sani, politician
Dahiru Sadi, footballer
Adam A Zango, Kannywood actor, musician, singer and dancer.
Talib Zanna (born 1990), basketball player in the Israel Basketball Premier League
 Efe Ambrose, footballer who played for the Nigeria national football team was born and raised here

See also 
 Railway stations in Nigeria
 Kaduna State
National Ear Care Centre

References

External links 

 
State capitals in Nigeria
Populated places in Kaduna State
Cities in Nigeria
1913 establishments in the Northern Nigeria Protectorate
Populated places established in 1913